Chung Tung-chin is a Taiwanese politician. He was elected to the Miaoli County Council in 2014 and became its speaker in 2018. He vacated his council seat and leadership in 2022 to take office as magistrate of Miaoli County.

Political career
Chung was elected a Miaoli County Councilor in 2014 and became its speaker in 2018. During Chung's speakership, the Miaoli County Council in 2019 became the first county council in Taiwan to hold a full session in Hakka.

Miaoli County Magistrate
Chung ran as a Kuomintang (KMT) candidate for the 2022 Miaoli County magistrate election but did not receive the party's endorsement; the KMT nomination went to Hsieh Fu-hung instead. Chung then registered as an independent candidate in June 2022 and was expelled from the KMT in September.

During the election campaign, Chung promised to continue the incumbent magistrate Hsu Yao-chang's policies. He also promised to carry out the social welfare programs of the Miaoli County Government, such as social housing, festival grants, free lunches for school students, etc. In October 2022, Legislative Yuan members affiliated with the Democratic Progressive Party petitioned the Control Yuan to investigate a statement of personal assets declared by Chung. That same month, Hsieh Fu-hung, the DPP, and the New Power Party presented evidence indicating that Chung had been convicted of murder in 1987, and urged him to withdraw his candidacy. In December 2022, the Miaoli District Prosecutors Office began investigating Chung's campaign regarding allegations of vote buying; in turn, Chung accused the authorities of political bias.

References

Living people
Magistrates of Miaoli County
Year of birth missing (living people)
Expelled members of the Kuomintang
21st-century Taiwanese politicians